Wulan railway station or Ulan railway station is a station on the Qinghai–Tibet Railway, in Ulan County, Qinghai province, China.

See also 
 Qinghai–Tibet Railway
 List of stations on Qinghai–Tibet railway

Stations on the Qinghai–Tibet Railway
Railway stations in Qinghai
Haixi Mongol and Tibetan Autonomous Prefecture